The 72nd annual Cannes Film Festival took place from 14 to 25 May 2019. Mexican filmmaker Alejandro González Iñárritu served as jury president. The Palme d'Or went to the South Korean film Parasite, directed by Bong Joon-ho; Bong became the first Korean director to win the award.

American film director Jim Jarmusch's ensemble zombie comedy film The Dead Don't Die served as the opening film of the festival. The festival honoured French filmmaker Agnès Varda, who died in March 2019, featuring her on the official poster of the festival. The photograph used was taken during the filming of her debut film La Pointe Courte (1955), which later screened at the Cannes Film Festival.

Juries

Main competition 
Alejandro González Iñárritu, Mexican director, Jury President
Enki Bilal, French author, artist and director
Robin Campillo, French director
Maimouna N'Diaye, Senegalese actress
Elle Fanning, American actress
Yorgos Lanthimos, Greek director
Paweł Pawlikowski, Polish director
Kelly Reichardt, American director
Alice Rohrwacher, Italian director

Un Certain Regard
Nadine Labaki, Lebanese director, Jury President
Marina Foïs, French actress 
Nurhan Sekerci-Porst, German film producer 
Lisandro Alonso, Argentine director 
Lukas Dhont, Belgian director

Caméra d'or
Rithy Panh, Cambodian-French director, Jury President
Alice Diop, French director
Sandrine Marques, French director, author and film critic
Benoît Delhomme, French cinematographer
Nicolas Naegelen, French president director of Polyson

Cinéfondation and short films
Claire Denis, French director, Jury President
Stacy Martin, French-UK actress 
Eran Kolirin, Israeli director 
Panos H. Koutras, Greek director 
Cătălin Mitulescu, Romanian director

Independent juries
International Critics' Week
Ciro Guerra, Colombian director, Jury President
Amira Casar, French-English actress
Marianne Slot, French-Danish film producer
Djia Mambu, Belgian-Congolese film journalist and critic
Jonas Carpignano, Italian-American director

L'Œil d'or
Yolande Zauberman, French director, Jury President
Romane Bohringer, French actress and director
Éric Caravaca, French actor and director
Iván Giroud, Cuban film festival director
Ross McElwee, American director

Queer Palm
Virginie Ledoyen, French actress, Jury President
Claire Duguet, French cinematographer and director
Kee-Yoon Kim, French comedian
Filipe Matzembacher, Brazilian director
Marcio Reolon, Brazilian director

Official selection

In competition
The following films were selected to compete for the Palme d'Or:

(CdO) indicates film eligible for the Caméra d'Or as a feature directorial debut.
(QP) indicates film in competition for the Queer Palm.

Un Certain Regard
The following films were selected to compete in the Un Certain Regard section:

(CdO) indicates film eligible for the Caméra d'Or as a feature directorial debut.
(QP) indicates film in competition for the Queer Palm.

Out of competition
The following films were selected to be screened out of competition:

(QP) indicates film in competition for the Queer Palm.
(ŒdO) indicates film eligible for the Œil d'or for documentary.

Special screenings
The following films were selected be shown in the special screenings section:

(CdO) indicates film eligible for the Caméra d'Or as a feature directorial debut.
(ŒdO) indicates film eligible for the Œil d'or for documentary feature.

Short films
Out of 4,240 entries, the following films were selected to compete for the Short Film Palme d'Or.

(ŒdO) indicates film eligible for the Œil d'or for documentary.
(QP) indicates film in competition for the Queer Palm.

Cinéfondation
The Cinéfondation section focuses on films made by students at film schools. The following 17 entries (14 live-action and 3 animated films) were selected out of 2,000 submissions. Six of the films selected represent schools participating in Cinéfondation for the first time.

(QP) indicates film in competition for the Queer Palm.

Cannes Classics
The full line-up for the Cannes Classics section was announced on 26 April 2019.

Restorations

Documentaries

Cinéma de la Plage
The Cinéma de la Plage is a part of the Official Selection of the festival. The outdoors screenings at the beach cinema of Cannes are open to the public.

Parallel sections

International Critics' Week
The following films were selected to be screened in the International Critics' Week section:

Features

Short films 

(QP) indicates film in competition for the Queer Palm.

Special screenings 

(QP) indicates film in competition for the Queer Palm.

Invitation 
Films from Morelia International Film Festival:

Directors' Fortnight
The following films were selected to be screened in the Directors' Fortnight section:

Features 

(CdO) indicates film eligible for the Caméra d'Or as a feature directorial debut.
(QP) indicates film in competition for the Queer Palm.

Special screenings

Short and medium-length films

(QP) indicates film in competition for the Queer Palm.

Exhibition

ACID
The following films were selected to be screened in the ACID (Association for the Distribution of Independent Cinema) section:

Feature films

(ŒdO) indicates film eligible for the Œil d'or as documentary.
(QP) indicates film in competition for the Queer Palm.

ACID Trip #3 - Argentina

Awards

Official awards

In Competition
The following awards were presented for films shown In Competition:

 Palme d'Or: Parasite by Bong Joon-ho
 Grand Prix: Atlantics by Mati Diop
 Best Director: Jean-Pierre and Luc Dardenne for Young Ahmed
 Jury Prize:
 Bacurau by Kleber Mendonça Filho and Juliano Dornelles
 Les Misérables by Ladj Ly
 Best Actress: Emily Beecham for Little Joe
 Best Actor: Antonio Banderas for Pain and Glory
 Best Screenplay: Céline Sciamma for Portrait of a Lady on Fire
 Special Mention: Elia Suleiman for It Must Be Heaven

Un Certain Regard
 Un Certain Regard Award: The Invisible Life of Eurídice Gusmão by Karim Aïnouz
 Un Certain Regard Jury Prize: Fire Will Come by Oliver Laxe
 Un Certain Regard Award for Best Director: Kantemir Balagov for Beanpole
 Un Certain Regard Jury Award for Best Performance: Chiara Mastroianni for On a Magical Night
 Un Certain Regard Special Jury Prize: 
 Albert Serra for Liberté
 Bruno Dumont for Joan of Arc
 Coup de Cœur Award:
 A Brother's Love by Monia Chokri
 The Climb by Michael Angelo Covino

Golden Camera
 Caméra d'Or: Our Mothers by César Díaz

Short films
 Short Film Palme d'Or: The Distance Between Us and the Sky by Vasilis Kekatos
 Special Mention: Monster God by Agustina San Martín

Cinéfondation
 First Prize: Mano a mano by Louise Courvoisier
 Second Prize: Hiêu by Richard Van
 Third Prize: 
 Ambience by Wisam Al Jafari
 The Little Soul by Barbara Rupik

Honorary Palme d'Or
 Honorary Palme d'Or: Alain Delon

Independent awards

FIPRESCI Prizes
 In Competition: It Must Be Heaven by Elia Suleiman
 Un Certain Regard: Beanpole by Kantemir Balagov 
 Parallel section: The Lighthouse by Robert Eggers (Directors' Fortnight)

Ecumenical Prize
 Prize of the Ecumenical Jury: A Hidden Life by Terrence Malick

International Critics' Week
 Nespresso Grand Prize: I Lost My Body by Jérémy Clapin
 Leitz Cine Discovery Prize for Short Film: She Runs by Qiu Yang
 Louis Roederer Foundation Rising Star Award: Ingvar Eggert Sigurðsson for A White, White Day
 Gan Foundation Award for Distribution: Vivarium by Lorcan Finnegan
 SACD Award: Our Mothers by César Díaz
 Canal+ Award for Short Film: Ikki Illa Meint by Andrias Høgenni

Directors' Fortnight
 Europa Cinemas Label Award for Best European Film: Alice and the Mayor by Nicolas Pariser
 SACD Award for Best French-language Film: An Easy Girl by Rebecca Zlotowski
 Illy Short Film Award: Stay Awake, Be Ready by Pham Thien An
 Carrosse d'Or: John Carpenter

L'Œil d'or
 L'Œil d'or: 
 For Sama by Waad Al-Kateab and Edward Watts
 The Cordillera of Dreams by Patricio Guzmán

Queer Palm
 Queer Palm Award: Portrait of a Lady on Fire by Céline Sciamma
 Short Film Queer Palm: The Distance Between Us and the Sky by Vasilis Kekatos

Prix François Chalais
 François Chalais Prize: A Hidden Life by Terrence Malick

Cannes Soundtrack Award
 Cannes Soundtrack Award: Alberto Iglesias for Pain and Glory

Vulcan Award of the Technical Artist
 Vulcan Award: Flora Volpelière (editing) and Julien Poupard (cinematography) for Les Misérables
 Special Mention: Claire Mathon for Atlantics and Portrait of a Lady on Fire (cinematography)
 Artistic Direction Mention: Lee Ha-jun for Parasite

Palm Dog
 Palm Dog Award: Sayuri for Once Upon a Time in Hollywood
 Grand Jury Prize: 
 Canine cast in Little Joe
 Canine cast in Aasha and the Street Dogs (Marché du Film)
 Palm DogManitarian Award: Google for their support of dogs in the workplace
 Underdog Award: The Unadoptable

Trophée Chopard
 Chopard Trophy: François Civil and Florence Pugh

Pierre Angénieux ExcelLens in Cinematography
 Pierre Angénieux Excellens in Cinematography: Bruno Delbonnel
 Special Encouragement Award for promising cinematographer: Modhura Palit

References

External links
 

2019 film festivals
2019 in French cinema
2019
May 2019 events in France